The 55th Pennsylvania Infantry was a Union army regiment active in the American Civil War.  It was organized at Harrisburg, Pennsylvania in 1861.

During its service it lost 479 men:  seven officers and 201 enlisted men killed and mortally wounded, and it lost three officers and 268 enlisted men by disease.

It was in South Carolina in 1862, including at the Battle of Simmon's Bluff on June 21.  For a time its commander occupied Frogmore, a plantation house on Edisto Island, South Carolina.

It was mustered out August 30. 1865, at Petersburg, Virginia.

References

Military units and formations established in 1861
Military units and formations disestablished in 1865
Units and formations of the Union Army from Pennsylvania
1861 establishments in Pennsylvania